Bo Kaeo may refer to:

Bo Kaeo Subdistrict in Na Khu District, Kalasin, Thailand
Bo Kaeo, Chiang Mai, a subdistrict in Samoeng District, Chiang Mai
Bo Kaeo Subdistrict in Na Muen District, Nan, Thailand
Bo Kaeo Subdistrict in Wang Hin District, Sisaket, Thailand
Bo Kaeo Subdistrict in Ban Muang District, Sakon Nakhon, Thailand

See also
Bokeo Province in Laos